Dipsas vagrans, Dunn's tree snake, is a non-venomous snake found in Peru.

References

Dipsas
Snakes of South America]
Endemic fauna of Peru
Reptiles of Peru
Reptiles described in 1923
Taxa named by Emmett Reid Dunn